Suir Road is a stop on the Luas light-rail tram system in Dublin, Ireland.  It opened in 2004 as a stop on the Red Line.  The stop is located at the intersection of Suir Road, Davitt Road and Dolphin Road, next to a Canal Lock.

To the west of the stop, the tram line runs alongside the bank of the Grand Canal.  To the east, the line crosses the canal on the Ann Devlin Bridge (named after prominent Irish republican Anne Devlin, whose name is mis-spelt on the dedication plaque), and then continues along the route of a derelict branch of the canal (the remaining navigable portion of the canal continues south-east, forming a ring around central Dublin).

The stop is also served by Dublin Bus routes 68, 68a, and 123.

Suir Road is intended to be a stop on the proposed Luas line to Lucan.

References

Luas Red Line stops in Dublin (city)